Goniobranchus kuniei is a species of very colourful sea slug, a dorid nudibranch, a marine gastropod mollusc in the family Chromodorididae.

Distribution
This species was described from New Caledonia. It is known from the western Pacific Ocean and eastern Indian Ocean from Fiji, Marshall Islands, Australia, Papua New Guinea, Indonesia, Malaysia, Philippines, and the  Taiwan.

Description
Goniobranchus kuniei has a pattern of blue spots with pale blue haloes on a creamy mantle. There is a double border to the mantle of purple and blue. The length of the body reaches  40 mm. The species Goniobranchus tritos and Goniobranchus geminus have similar colour patterns.

Habitat 
This species likes waters that are between 21 and 26 degrees Celsius and is often found between 5 and 40 meters.

References

External links 
 Goniobranchus kuniei, video at Bali, Indonesia
 

Chromodorididae
Gastropods described in 1930
Taxa named by Alice Pruvot-Fol